Mongolia competed at the 2022 Winter Paralympics in Beijing, China which took place between 4–13 March 2022. In total, three athletes competed. It was the fifth time the country competed at the Winter Paralympics.

Competitors
The following is the list of number of competitors participating at the Games per sport/discipline.

Alpine skiing

One alpine skier represented Mongolia.

Men

Cross-country skiing

Mongolia competed in cross-country skiing.

Men
Distance

Sprint

See also
Mongolia at the Paralympics
Mongolia at the 2022 Winter Olympics

References

Nations at the 2022 Winter Paralympics
2022
Winter Paralympics